Events in 1995 in animation.



Events

January
 January 2: The Shnookums and Meat Funny Cartoon Show broadcasts its first episode.
 January 8: The Simpsons episode "Homer the Great" is first broadcast, guest starring Patrick Stewart.
 January 22: The Simpsons episode "And Maggie Makes Three" is first broadcast.

February
 February 5: The Simpsons episode "Bart's Comet" is first broadcast.
 February 12: The Simpsons episode "Homie the Clown" is first broadcast, guest starring Dick Cavett and Johnny Unitas. 
 February 13: Chuck Jones receives a star at the Hollywood Walk of Fame.
 February 19: The Simpsons episode "Bart vs. Australia" is first broadcast.
 February 26: The Simpsons episode "Homer vs. Patty and Selma" is first broadcast, guest starring Mel Brooks and Susan Sarandon.

March
 March 5: The Simpsons episode "A Star Is Burns" is first broadcast; it is a crossover with The Critic and guest stars Jon Lovitz and Maurice LaMarche. Matt Groening heavily criticized the episode, feeling that it was just an advertisement for The Critic, and that people would incorrectly associate the show with him. Because of this, he was uncredited in the episode.
 March 19: The Simpsons episode "Lisa's Wedding" is first broadcast. It is the first episode to take place in the future, and guest stars Mandy Patinkin.
 March 27: 67th Academy Awards: 
 Bob's Birthday by Alison Snowden and David Fine wins the Academy Award for Best Animated Short Film.
 Elton John and Tim Rice's song Can You Feel the Love Tonight from The Lion King wins the Academy Award for Best Original Song, while Hans Zimmer wins the Academy Award for Best Original Score for the same film.

April
 April 7: A Goofy Movie, produced by the Walt Disney Company, premieres.
 April 9: The Simpsons episode "Two Dozen and One Greyhounds" is first broadcast.
 April 12: Don Bluth and Gary Goldman's The Pebble and the Penguin premieres.
 April 16: The Simpsons episode "The PTA Disbands" is first broadcast.
 April 30: The Simpsons episode "'Round Springfield" is first broadcast in which the character Bleeding Gums Murphy dies; it also guest stars Steve Allen.

May
 May 7: The Simpsons episode "The Springfield Connection" is first broadcast.
 May 14: The Simpsons episode "Lemon of Troy" is first broadcast.
 May 21: The Simpsons episode "Who Shot Mr. Burns? (Part One)" is first broadcast and ends with a cliffhanger in which Mr. Burns is shot by an unidentified person. It is the first episode to consist of two parts. The assassin is revealed four months later in the second part on September 17. It also guest stars Tito Puente.
 May 28: The first episode of Dr. Katz, Professional Therapist is broadcast.

June
 June 10: The Walt Disney Company releases Pocahontas, directed by Mike Gabriel and Eric Goldberg.

September
 September 9: Kids' WB launches.
 The first episodes of Freakazoid!, Pinky and the Brain, The Sylvester & Tweety Mysteries, and Earthworm Jim air.
 September 17: The Simpsons episode "Who Shot Mr. Burns? (Part Two)" is first broadcast as the first episode of the seventh season, and reveals that the culprit who shot Mr. Burns was Maggie Simpson. It also guest stars Tito Puente. 
 September 24: The Simpsons episode "Radioactive Man" is first broadcast, guest starring Mickey Rooney. 
 September 25: The first episode of Timon & Pumbaa, produced by the Walt Disney Company airs.

October
 October 1: The Simpsons episode "Home Sweet Homediddly-Dum-Doodily" is first broadcast.
 October 4: The first episode of Neon Genesis Evangelion airs.
 October 8: The Simpsons episode "Bart Sells His Soul" is first broadcast.
 October 15: The Simpsons episode "Lisa the Vegetarian" is first broadcast, where Lisa becomes a vegetarian; it also guest stars Paul McCartney and Linda McCartney.
 October 29: The Simpsons episode "Treehouse of Horror VI" is first broadcast and features a segment which has 3D animation. It also guest stars Paul Anka.

November
 November 5: The Simpsons episode "King-Size Homer" is first broadcast.
 November 18: Ghost in the Shell is first released, an anime feature film directed by Mamoru Oshii, based on the manga series Ghost in the Shell by Masamune Shirow. It will later become a cult classic.
 November 19: The Simpsons episode "Mother Simpson" is first broadcast, guest starring Glenn Close, Mona Simpson and Harry Morgan.
 November 22: Toy Story, the first CGI animated feature film, is released by Pixar and the Walt Disney Company.
 November 26: The Simpsons episode "Sideshow Bob's Last Gleaming" is first broadcast, guest starring R. Lee Ermey.

December
 December 1: Trey Parker and Matt Stone make the animated short Jesus vs. Santa, which features embryonal versions of the characters they'll later use in South Park and will become a viral sensation under the title The Spirit of Christmas.
 December 3: The Simpsons episode "The Simpsons 138th Episode Spectacular" is first broadcast as a retrospective episode of the series.
 December 17: The Simpsons episode "Marge Be Not Proud" is first broadcast as the second Christmas episode of the series in which Bart is accused of shoplifting; it also guest stars Lawrence Tierney. 
 December 28: Gerald McBoing-Boing is added to the National Film Registry.

Specific date unknown
 Helen Hill's Scratch and Crow is first released.

Films released

 January 20 - The Kingdom of Green Glade (Poland)
 January 31 - Gargoyles the Movie: The Heroes Awaken (United States and Japan)
 February 3 - The Monkeys and the Secret Weapon (Denmark)
 February 6 - Hercules (United States and Japan)
 February 25 - Dragon Knight: Another Knight on the Town (Japan)
 March 4:
 Doraemon: Nobita's Diary of the Creation of the World (Japan)
 Dragon Ball Z: Fusion Reborn (Japan)
 March 7 - The New Adventures of Peter Rabbit (United States)
 March 12:
 Alice in Wonderland (United States and Japan)
 Slam Dunk: Shohoku's Greatest Challenge! Burning Hanamichi Sakuragi (Japan)
 March 17 - Sleeping Beauty (United States and Japan)
 March 28 - VeggieTales: Are You My Neighbor? (United States)
 April 1 - Elementalors (Japan)
 April 7:
 A Goofy Movie (United States)
 Lesson XX (Japan)
 April 11 - Pocahontas (United States)
 April 12 - The Pebble and the Penguin (United States and Ireland)
 April 15 - Crayon Shin-chan: Unkokusai's Ambition (Japan)
 April 22 - Lupin III: Farewell to Nostradamus (Japan)
 April 27 - Snow White (United States and Japan)
 May 2 - The Prince and the Pauper (United States)
 May 9 - Black Beauty (United States and Japan)
 June 10 - Catnapped! (Japan)
 June 18 - Run (Japan)
 June 23 - Pocahontas (United States)
 July 12 - The Katta-kun Story (Japan)
 July 15: 
 Dragon Ball Z: Wrath of the Dragon (Japan)
 Slam Dunk: Howling Basketman Spirit!! Hanamichi and Rukawa's Hot Summer (Japan)
 Whisper of the Heart (Japan)
 July 20 - Junkers Come Here (Japan)
 July 22 - Kazu & Yasu Hero Tanjō (Japan)
 July 29: 
 Legend of Crystania: The Motion Picture (Japan)
 Soreike! Anpanman Yūreisen o Yattsukero!! (Japan)
 July 31:
 Little Red Riding Hood (United States and Japan)
 The Nutcracker (United States and Japan)
 August 4 - Lupin III: The Pursuit of Harimao's Treasure (Japan)
 August 5:
 The Red Hawk (South Korea)
 Slayers The Motion Picture (Japan)
 August 9 - Curly, the Littlest Puppy (United States and Japan)
 August 19 - The Diary of Anne Frank (Japan)
 August 27 - Macross Plus: Movie Edition (Japan)
 August 29:
 The Christmas Elves (United States)
 Noah's Ark (United States)
 September - The Tale of Tillie's Dragon (United States)
 October 4 - Gumby: The Movie (United States)
 October 12 - The Real Shlemiel (France, Germany and Hungary)
 October 16 - Pocahontas (Australia)
 October 17 - Jungle Book (United States and Japan)
 October 30 - Drawn from Memory (United States)
 November - Days of Rage (Greece)
 November 9 - Magic Gift of the Snowman (United States and Japan)
 November 18 - Ghost in the Shell (Japan and United Kingdom)
 November 21 - The Snow Queen (United Kingdom)
 November 22:
 Toy Story (United States)
 Yamato Takeru: After War (Japan)
 November 28 - VeggieTales: Rack, Shack and Benny (United States)
 November 29 - Lesson of Darkness (Japan)
 December 15 - The Land Before Time III: The Time of the Great Giving (United States)
 December 18:
 The Legend of the Blue Wolves (Japan)
 Silent Service (Japan)
 December 22 - Balto (United States and United Kingdom)
 December 23:
 The Hungry Best 5 (South Korea)
 Memories (Japan)
 Sailor Moon SuperS: The Movie (Japan)
 December 24:
 The Adventures of Mole (United Kingdom)
 Dol-a-on yeong-ung Hong Gil-dong (South Korea)
 December 25 - The Wind in the Willows (United Kingdom)
 Specific date unknown:
 Cinderella: Conspiracy at the Emerald Castle (Italy)
 The Elixir (Russia)
 Heidi (United States and Japan)
 Koushi-den (Japan, South Korea and Taiwan)
 The Mirror of Wonders (Italy)

Television series debuts

Television series endings

Births

January
 January 17: Indya Moore, American actress and model (voice of Brooklyn in Moon Girl and Devil Dinosaur, Shep in the Steven Universe Future episode "Little Graduation").

February
 February 3: Kellen Goff, American actor (voice of Kai Chisaki / Overhaul in My Hero Academia, Diavolo in JoJo's Bizarre Adventure, Mike Rochip / Techno-Pirate and Hot Dog Dan in the Miraculous: Tales of Ladybug & Cat Noir episode "Miraculous World: New York - United Heroez").

May
 May 3: Katie Chang, American actress (voice of Maddie Kim in Pantheon).
 May 4: Shameik Moore, American actor and rapper (voice of Miles Morales in Spider-Man: Into the Spider-Verse and Spider-Man: Across the Spider-Verse).

July
 July 4: Post Malone, American rapper, singer, songwriter, and record producer (voice of Brooklyn Bystander in Spider-Man: Into the Spider-Verse, Ray Fillet in Teenage Mutant Ninja Turtles: Mutant Mayhem).

September
 September 12: Ryan Potter, American actor (voice of Hiro Hamada in the Big Hero 6 franchise, Kenji Kon in Jurassic World Camp Cretaceous).

October
 October 3: Ayo Edebiri, American actor, comedian (voice of Missy Foreman-Greenwald in Big Mouth, April O'Neil in Teenage Mutant Ninja Turtles: Mutant Mayhem), television writer (Craig of the Creek) and producer (Big Mouth).
 October 4: Ambrosia Kelley, American former child actress (voice of Cora Walker in The Zeta Project episode "Change of Heart", young Sharon Hawkins in the Static Shock episode "Tantrum").

November
 November 17: Zach Barack, American actor (voice of Barney Guttman in Dead End: Paranormal Park).
 November 23: Austin Majors, American actor (voice of young Jim Hawkins in Treasure Planet, Blue Teammate #3 in The Ant Bully, Thomas in the American Dad! episode "Of Ice and Men"), (d. 2023).

Deaths

January
 January 12: William Pomerance, American animator (Walt Disney Studios), dies at age 89.
 January 19: Don Tobin, American animator and comics artist (Walt Disney Animation Studios), dies at age 79.
 January 21: John Halas, Hungarian-English animator, film producer and director (Halas & Batchelor, Animal Farm, the animated music video of Love Is All by Roger Glover), dies at age 82.
 January 24: Frank Emery, American mural artist, jazz musician, photographer, animator, illustrator, and comics artist, dies at age 37.
 January 26: Cecil Roy, American actress (voice of Casper the Friendly Ghost and Little Lulu), dies at age 94.

March
 March 4: Gloria Wood, American singer and actress (voice of Nelly in Nelly's Folly, Suzy Sparrow in Toot, Whistle, Plunk and Boom), dies at age 71.
 March 11: Myfanwy Talog, Welsh actress (voice of narrator in Wil Cwac Cwac,. Potholer and Linda in the SuperTed episode "SuperTed and the Pothole Rescue", Princess Amaranth in Alias the Jester, Mrs. Clonkers in The BFG), dies at age 50.
 March 19 Yasuo Yamada, Japanese actor (voice of the title character in Lupin III), dies at age 62.

April
 April 8: Michael Graham Cox, English actor (voice of Boromir in The Lord of the Rings, Bigwig in Watership Down), dies at age 57. 
 April 14: Burl Ives, American singer and actor (voice of Sam the Snowman in Rudolph the Red-Nosed Reindeer), dies at 85.
 April 19: Preston Blair, American animator (Walter Lantz, Charles Mintz, Walt Disney Company, MGM, Tex Avery, Hanna-Barbera), dies at age 86.

May
 May 2: Michael Hordern, English actor (voice of Jacob Marley in A Christmas Carol, Frith in Watership Down, Badger in The Wind in the Willows, narrator in Paddington), dies at age 83.
 May 18: Elizabeth Montgomery, American actress (voice of Samantha in The Flintstones episode "Samantha", Barmaid in the Batman: The Animated Series episode "Showdown"), dies at age 62.
 May 26: Friz Freleng, American animator and cartoonist (Looney Tunes, The Pink Panther), dies at age 88.

June
 June 27: Yoni Chen, Israeli actor (dub voice of various Looney Tunes characters and the Tin Man in The Wonderful Wizard of Oz), dies at age 41.

July
 July 4: Eva Gabor, Hungarian-American actress (voice of Duchess in The Aristocats, Bianca in The Rescuers and The Rescuers Down Under), dies at age 76.
 July 25: Balthasar Lippisch, German illustrator, caricaturist, animator and comics artist (worked on the TV series Pip & Zip), dies at age 74 or 75.

August
 August 11: Phil Harris, American comedian, actor and jazz singer (voice of Baloo in The Jungle Book, Thomas O'Malley in The Aristocats and Little John in Robin Hood), dies at age 91.

September
 September 5: Paul Julian, American animator, background artist (My Little Pony: The Movie, FernGully: The Last Rainforest), sound effects artist (Warner Bros. Cartoons) and voice actor (Road Runner), dies at age 81. 
 September 12: Lubomír Beneš, Czech animator and director (co-creator of Pat & Mat), dies at age 59.
 September 21:
 Irven Spence, American animator (Charles Mintz, Ub Iwerks, Warner Bros. Cartoons, MGM, Hanna-Barbera, Chuck Jones, DePatie-Freleng Enterprises, Ralph Bakshi), dies at age 86.
 Ken Willard, American animator (Gumby Adventures, The Nightmare Before Christmas, Bump in the Night, Gumby: The Movie, Toy Story), dies at age 36.
 September 22: John Whitney, American animator, composer, and inventor (Five Film Exercises, co-animated the opening sequence of Vertigo), dies at age 78.
 September 25: Kei Tomiyama, Japanese voice actor dies at 56.

October
 October 5: Linda Gary, American actress (voice of Queen Salena in Nausicaä of the Valley of the Wind, Teela, the Sorceress of Castle Grayskull, Evil-Lyn, and Queen Marlena in He-Man and the Masters of the Universe, Grandma Longneck in The Land Before Time franchise, Entrapta, Madame Razz, Scorpia, Shadow Weaver, and Glimmer in She-Ra: Princess of Power, Chromia in The Transformers, Aunt May in seasons 1-3 of Spider-Man, additional voices in Batman: The Animated Series and The Pirates of Dark Water), dies at age 50.
 October 13: Michael Lah, American animator and film director (Walt Disney Company, worked for Tex Avery), dies at age 83. 
 October 21: Maxene Andrews, American singer (co-sang the "Johnny Fedora and Alice Blue Bonnet" segment in Make Mine Music and "Little Toot" in Melody Time), dies at age 79.
 October 23: Mary Wickes, American actress (live-action model for Cruella De Vil in 101 Dalmatians, voice of Laverne in The Hunchback of Notre Dame), dies at age 85.

November
 November 4: Jackie Banks, American animation checker and scene planner (Hanna-Barbera, This Is America, Charlie Brown, The Simpsons, Tom and Jerry: The Movie), dies at age 54.
 November 9: Robert O. Cook, American sound engineer (Walt Disney Animation Studios), dies at age 92.
 November 16: Charles Gordone, American playwright, actor, director, educator and actor (voice of Preacher Fox in Coonskin), dies at age 70. 
 November 19: Wan Guchan, Chinese animator, film director (founder of the Shanghai Animation Film Studio, Shuzhendong Chinese Typewriter, Uproar in the Studio, The Camel's Dance, Princess Iron Fan, Havoc in Heaven, Why is the Crow Black-Coated), dies at age 95.

December
 December 4: Petar Gligorovski, Macedonian painter, comics artist, animator and film director (Adam 5 do 12), dies at age 57.
 December 20: Madge Sinclair, Jamaican actress (voice of Sarabi in The Lion King), dies from leukemia at age 57.
 December 30: Doris Grau, American actress (voice of Lunchlady Doris in The Simpsons, Doris Grossman in The Critic), dies at age 71.

Specific date unknown
 Alex Cubie, Scottish comics artist and animator (Rank Film Distributors), dies at age 83 or 84.

See also
1995 in anime

Sources

External links 
Animated works of the year, listed in the IMDb

 
1990s in animation